This List of theatres and entertainment venues in Paris includes present-day opera houses and theatres, cabarets, music halls and other places of live entertainment in Paris. It excludes theatrical companies and outdoor venues. Former venues are included in the List of former or demolished entertainment venues in Paris and jazz venues in List of jazz clubs in Paris.

The list is by name in alphabetical order, but it can be resorted by address, arrondissement, opening date (of the building, not the performing company), number of seats (main + secondary stage), or main present-day function. Former names of the theatre (again the building, not the performing company) are included in the notes.

List

References
Evene.fr list of Paris theatres, accessed 29 April 2011

See also
List of jazz clubs in Paris
List of former or demolished entertainment venues in Paris

 
 
 
 
Theatres and opera houses
Paris
Theatres and opera houses
Paris